Liivaküla is a village in Väike-Maarja Parish, Lääne-Viru County, in northeastern Estonia. It has a population of 79 (as of 1 January 2011).

The Kiltsi Manor which was the home of famous navigator Adam Johann von Krusenstern is located on the territory of Liivaküla village.

References

External links
Kiltsi Manor at Estonian Manors Portal

Villages in Lääne-Viru County